Stenoglene dehanicus is a moth in the family Eupterotidae. It was described by Strand in 1911. It is found in Cameroon, the Central African Republic and the Democratic Republic of Congo (Orientale).

References

Moths described in 1911
Janinae